Chaplain (Major General) William Richard Arnold (June 10, 1881 – January 7, 1965) was an American Army officer and  prelate of the Roman Catholic Church. He served as the 5th Chief of Chaplains of the United States Army from 1937 to 1945 and Military Delegate of the Armed Forces from 1945 until his death in 1965.

Biography

Early life and education
William Arnold was born in Wooster, Ohio, to Augustine Adam and Catherine Mary (née Dalton) Arnold. He attended St. Joseph's College in Rensselaer, Indiana, graduating in 1902. Before beginning his studies for the priesthood, he learned his father's trade of cigar-making and later worked as a bar-straightener at a steel mill in Muncie. In Peru, Indiana, he became acquainted and quartered with the Hagenbeck-Wallace Circus.

Arnold then studied at St. Bernard's Seminary in Rochester, New York.

Ordination and ministry
Arnold was ordained a priest for the Diocese of Fort Wayne on June 13, 1908. His first assignment was as a curate at St. Charles Borromeo Church in Peru. In April 1913, he entered the Army Chaplain Corps with the rank of first lieutenant. Arnold then served at Fort Washington, Maryland, until 1915, when he was sent to Fort Mills at Corregidor in the Philippines. Returning to the United States in 1918, he briefly served at Fort Winfield Scott in California, and taught at the Chaplain Training School at Camp Taylor in Louisville, Kentucky.

Arnold subsequently served at Fort Hancock in New Jersey (1918–19), and was promoted to captain in May 1919. He was director of the Chaplain Training School at Fort Leavenworth in Kansas from 1925 to 1929 and named a major in April 1927. He then returned to the Philippines, serving as department chaplain at Fort McKinley from 1929 to 1931. After serving at Fort Bliss in Texas from 1931 to 1937, he was chaplain of the First Cavalry Division and supervising chaplain of the Arizona, New Mexico, West Texas District of the Civilian Conservation Corps. He was promoted to lieutenant colonel in April 1933, and served again as director of the Chaplain Training School at Fort Leavenworth from June to November 1937.

Chief of the Army Chaplain Corps
Chaplain Arnold served two terms (8 years) as Chief of the Army Chaplain Corps and led the greatest transformation of the Army Chaplaincy.  On December 23, 1937, Arnold was appointed Chief of the Army Chaplain Corps by President Franklin D. Roosevelt, with the rank of colonel. He was the first Catholic to hold the office. He was named a papal chamberlain by Pope Pius XI in August 1938, and raised to the rank of domestic prelate by Pope Pius XII in January 1942. He became a brigadier general on November 21, 1941, and was re-appointed Chief of Chaplains on December 23 of that year. Arnold was promoted to the rank of major general on November 17, 1944. He continued to serve as Chief of Chaplains until April 1, 1945, when he became Assistant Inspector General of the Army.

Contributions to music
Arnold felt that music was essential to Army chaplaincy and delegated the authority for editing a new hymnal, The Hymnal Army and Navy, to Ivan L. Bennett (later to become Chief of Chaplains 1952-1954), to replace The Army and Navy Hymnal (1920) edited by John B. Frazier and Julian E. Yates. He also felt that the Chaplain Corps should have their own march, an effort that resulted in the "Soldiers of God," with stirring music composed by Ben Machan and lyrics by Private Hy Zaret.

Military Delegate of the Armed Forces
On May 5, 1945, Arnold was appointed Military Delegate of the Armed Forces and Titular Bishop of Phocaea by Pius XII. He received his episcopal consecration on the following October 11 from Archbishop Francis Spellman, with Bishops John F. Noll and John Francis O'Hara serving as co-consecrators, at St. Patrick's Cathedral. He traveled extensively during his 19-year tenure, visiting American military installations throughout the world and administering the sacraments to members of the armed services and their families.

Arnold died at St. Clare's Hospital in New York City, at age 83.

See also

 Catholic Church hierarchy
 Catholic Church in the United States
 Historical list of the Catholic bishops of the United States
 Insignia of Chaplain Schools in the US Military
 List of Catholic bishops of the United States
 List of Catholic bishops of the United States: military service
 Lists of patriarchs, archbishops, and bishops
 Military chaplain
 Religious symbolism in the United States military
 United States military chaplains

References

External links
Archdiocese for the Military Services, USA, official website
Archdiocese for the Military Services of the United States. GCatholic.org. Retrieved 2010-08-20.
Generals of World War II

1881 births
1965 deaths
People from Wooster, Ohio
St. Bernard's School of Theology and Ministry alumni
Saint Joseph's College (Indiana) alumni
United States Army generals of World War II
United States Army generals
Recipients of the Distinguished Service Medal (US Army)
Burials at Arlington National Cemetery
Civilian Conservation Corps people
Chiefs of Chaplains of the United States Army
United States Army personnel of World War I
World War I chaplains
World War II chaplains
People from Muncie, Indiana
Catholics from Ohio
Catholics from Indiana
20th-century Roman Catholic bishops in the United States